It Was Always So Easy (To Find An Unhappy Woman) is the second album by country singer Moe Bandy (Marion Franklin Bandy, Jr.) released in 1974 on the GRC Label.

Track listing
"It Was Always So Easy (To Find an Unhappy Woman)" (Sanger D. "Whitey" Shafer, A. L. "Doodle" Owens) - 2:39
"Don't Anyone Make Love at Home Anymore" (Dallas Frazier) - 2:30
"Somebody That's Good" (Eddy Raven, Ray Baker) - 2:55
"How Can I Get You Out of My Heart (When I Can't Get You Off Of My Mind)" (A. L. "Doodle" Owens) - 2:28
"Loving You Was All I Ever Needed" (Stan Kesler, Bobby Wood†) - 2:41
"Home in San Antone" (Floyd Jenkins) - 2:14
"I'm Looking For a New Way To Love You" (Sanger D. "Whitey" Shafer, Moe Bandy) - 2:37
"One Thing Leads To Another" (Eddy Raven) - 3:03
"It's Better Than Going Home Alone" (Truman Stearnes, Guy Coleman) - 2:35
"I'm Gonna Listen To Me" (Dallas Frazier) - 2:21

†"Loving You Was All I Ever Needed" was attributed to Dallas Frazier on the album cover, but to Stan Kesler and Bobby Wood on the record label.

Musicians
Steel Guitar - Weldon Myrick
Fiddle (& Mandolin on track 6) - Johnny Gimble
Piano - Hargus "Pig" Robbins
Drums - Kenny Malone
Bass - Bob Moore
Guitar - Dave Kirby
Rhythm Guitar - Chip Young, Ray Edenton, Bob Thompson
Everything - Charlie McCoy

Backing vocals 
The Jordanaires

Production
Sound engineer - Lou Bradley
Photography - Herb Burnett, Pinwheel Studios

References 

1974 albums
Moe Bandy albums
Albums produced by Ray Baker (music producer)